William Hill & Son was one of the main organ builders in England during the 19th century.

The founder
William Hill was born in Spilsby, Lincolnshire in 1789. He married Mary, the daughter of organ-builder Thomas Elliot, on 30 October 1818 in St Pancras Parish Church, and worked for Thomas Elliott from 1825. The company was known as Elliott and Hill until Elliott died in 1832.

When William Hill died in 1870 a memorial window was installed in the church at Spilsby, Lincolnshire.

The company
On Elliot's death in 1832, William Hill inherited the firm. In 1837 he formed a partnership with Federick Davison who left in the following year to form a partnership with John Gray, Gray and Davison.

From 1832 William Hill's elder son William joined him in the firm. From 1855 William Hill's younger son Thomas joined the company and took control after his father's death in 1870.

When Thomas died in 1893 the firm continued under his son, Arthur George Hill, until 1916 when it was amalgamated with Norman & Beard into a huge organ-building concern as William Hill & Son & Norman & Beard Ltd. later shortened to Hill, Norman & Beard.

Examples of the firm's work include:

 Peterborough Cathedral, 1894, subsequently Hill, Norman & Beard (1930/31), Harrison & Harrison (1980-present). Case designed by A. G. Hill.
 Sydney Town Hall Grand Organ, 1886–89, opened 1890, the largest organ in the world at the time of its construction, with a case designed by A. G. Hill
 Melbourne Town Hall, opened 1872, destroyed by fire 1925
 Adelaide Town Hall, 1877, reconstructed and installed at the Barossa Regional Gellery, Tanunda, South Australia, reopened 2014
 Christ Church, Llanfairfechan, Wales 1895/1902.
 Church of St Mary The Virgin, Tottenham London N17 9XE built from  1889 and received Grade 1 listing in 2004 as a heritage organ due to it being in its original state with Barker lever Action intact and manual air pump working and many stops given the relatively small size of the organ.  
 Birmingham Town Hall 1832
 St Andrew's Cathedral, Sydney 1866, rebuilt by Hill, Norman & Beard and Orgues Letourneau
 Trinity Methodist Church in Burton-upon-Trent, 1869. After the closing of the church in 2011, the organ was transferred to the Catholic St. Afra church in Berlin, and inaugurated on 22 November 2015. It is regarded as the most significant English organ in Germany.
 St Peter's Church, Streatham 1870
 St John's Church, Torquay 1872
 St Peter's Church Organ, Mundham, 1877
 Thomas Coats Memorial Baptist Church in Paisley 1890.
 St Andrew's, Croydon, 1891, and a replacement in 1906.
 St Augustine's Church, Penarth, 1895 
 Kidderminster Town Hall, Worcestershire, 1855 
 St Alban's Church, Ilford, England
 St Peter's Church, Mundham, England
 Christ Church/Crimean Memorial Church, Istanbul,1911

References

Pipe organ building companies
Organ builders of the United Kingdom
Musical instrument manufacturing companies of the United Kingdom